Kafr Buhum (Syriac: ܟܟܦܪ ܒܚܡ), also known as Kfarbou, is a town in central Syria, administratively part of the Hama Governorate, located 9 km southwest of Hama,  north Damascus and  south of Aleppo. Nearby localities include al-Rabiaa and Matnin to the northwest, Tayzin to the north, al-Khalidiyah to the east, Tell Qartal to the southeast, Birin to the south and al-Muah to the southwest. According to the Syria Central Bureau of Statistics (CBS), Kafr Buhum had a population of 12,194 in the 2004 census. Its inhabitants are predominantly Christian. It is 330 meters (1082 ft) above the sea level.

Geography 
Kafr Buhum is situated between the Orontes Valley to the east and south, the Masyaf Plateau to the west, the Mahardah Plateau to the north and the basaltic Harbnafsah Plateau to the southwest. The town's topography in the east and south is flatter than the north and west.

The town has a Mediterranean climate, in which winters are cold and rainy and summers warm and dry.

Etymology 
All sources indicate that the first part of the town's name, Kafr, derives from the Syriac word for "farm" or "village". The second part has several possible meanings, including, the plural of the Syriac word Pehmi which means "rock", the Syriac word Buhum which means "strong man", Kafr Abu which means "large house" and the Arabic Ebham, which means "thumb". The latter name derives from a local legend which holds that a thumb of Saint George is buried in Kafr Buhum's Saint George Church.

History 
Settlement in the town probably started with the movement of people from the surrounding caves, as indicated by archaeological evidence in nearby terraces. Over time, people from different regions migrated to Kafr Buhum.

The town is ancient and was possibly established 2,000 years ago. There have been a number of important Christian spiritual figures from or associated with Kafr Buhum throughout history. Among them are Gregorios bin Fadil, the first Aleppo-based bishop of the Melkite Greek Church who remained at the Episcopal from 1540 to 1582, performing research in theology and the Book of Proverbs.

Kafr Buhum contains many historic churches, including the Saint George Church which was originally an ancient structure. It contains 18th and 19th-century icons mostly by painter Hanna Saliba, church manuscripts belonging to the 17th and 18th centuries, and some old silver tools. There is also the Church of Saint Mary which dates back more than 2,000 years as an Ancient Roman temple that existed prior to the spread of Christianity. There are shrines dedicated to St. John the Baptist and the Forty Martyrs of Sebaste. There are also two churches dedicated to Prophit Elijha: one is Melkite Catholic which dates back to 1960's, and the other is a Greek Orthodox cathedral, which is also one of the largest cathedrals in the Arab world. The town contains many caves and archaeological sites.

Social relations 

Inhabitants of the town have worked in commerce, agricultural and industry jobs. The town annually has many small carnivals, but the most important and the largest one is  Easter Monday (Arabic: اثنين الباعوث) (the second day after Easter Sunday). All the voluntary associations of the town participate in this carnival and more than 400 children contribute.

The town has a large number of doctors, engineers and other professionals, most of whom are expatriates. Kafr Buhum is known for “white stone careers” of construction and the inhabitants work in agriculture and manufacturing. They own many lands around the town where they cultivate corn, cotton, white beets and other crops.

Notes

References 

 Kafr Buhum Gate. Retrieved on May 16, 2008.
 Kafr Buhum website. Retrieved on May 17, 2007.
 Saloum, Sorgham Saloum (2000) . Kafr buhum Past and Present Book.
 
 .
 .
 Kafr Buhum website.
 Kafr Buhum website.
 Kafr Buhum website.
 Kafr Buhum website.

Bibliography

 Ottomans in Syria: A History of Justice and Oppression. Dick Douwes. I.B.Tauris, 2000. .

External links 
Kafr Buhum Gate
youtube/KafrBuhum
Kafr Buhum on Facebook 

Populated places in Hama District
Towns in Hama Governorate
Christian communities in Syria